On 27 January 2016, up to a dozen car bombs were set off in the city of Ramadi, attacking the 10th Iraqi army division. The attack killed 55 Iraqi soldiers and pro-government tribal fighters, wounding an unknown number as well. The Islamic State of Iraq and the Levant claimed responsibility for the attack.

See also
 List of terrorist incidents, January–June 2016

References

2016 murders in Iraq
21st-century mass murder in Iraq
ISIL terrorist incidents in Iraq
Car and truck bombings in Iraq
Mass murder in 2016
Terrorist incidents in Iraq in 2016
January 2016 crimes in Asia
Islamic terrorist incidents in 2016